Insalebria concineratella is a species of snout moth in the genus Insalebria. It was described by Ragonot in 1887, and is known from Kazakhstan.

References

Moths described in 1887
Phycitinae